Amedeo Ciccanti (born 15 July 1951) is an Italian politician who served as Mayor of Ascoli Piceno (1987–1990), Senator for two legislatures (2001–2006, 2006–2008) and Deputy (2008–2013).

References

Living people
1951 births
Mayors of Ascoli Piceno
Deputies of Legislature XVI of Italy
Senators of Legislature XIV of Italy
Senators of Legislature XV of Italy
Christian Democracy (Italy) politicians
Union of the Centre (2002) politicians